Cottondale is an unincorporated community in Wise County, in the U.S. state of Texas.

History
A post office was established in 1875, and it was discontinued in 1912.

References

Unincorporated communities in Wise County, Texas
Unincorporated communities in Texas